Jeongseok Airport  is a small airport located near the city of Seogwipo, in Jeju province in South Korea. The airport is owned by Korean Air and is used as an aviation training centre. The name of the airport originated by the art name of Cho Choong-hoon, the founder of Hanjin Group.

See also
 Transportation in South Korea
 Busiest airports in South Korea by passenger traffic

References

External links
 

Buildings and structures in Jeju Province
Airports in South Korea